Mamjin (also Romanized as Māmjīn, Māmchīn, and Māmajīn) is a village in Basharyat-e Gharbi Rural District, Basharyat District, Abyek County, Qazvin Province, Iran. At the 2006 census, its population was 203, in 51 families.

References 

Populated places in Abyek County